Jean Patrick Jonathan Drack (born 16 November 1988 in Beau-Bassin Rose-Hill) is a Mauritian athlete specialising in the triple jump. He represented his country at the 2015 World Championships in Beijing finishing eleventh. He also competed at the previous edition in Moscow but without qualifying for the final.

His personal bests in the event are 17.05 metres outdoors (2015) and 16.67 metres indoors (Karlsruhe 2016).

He competed for Mauritius at the 2016 Summer Olympics but did not qualify for the final. He was the flag bearer for Mauritius during the closing ceremony.

Competition record

References

External links
 

1988 births
Living people
Mauritian triple jumpers
Male triple jumpers
World Athletics Championships athletes for Mauritius
Athletes (track and field) at the 2014 Commonwealth Games
Athletes (track and field) at the 2018 Commonwealth Games
Commonwealth Games competitors for Mauritius
Athletes (track and field) at the 2016 Summer Olympics
Olympic athletes of Mauritius
Mauritian male athletes
Olympic male triple jumpers
Athletes (track and field) at the 2019 African Games
African Games competitors for Mauritius
African Games medalists in athletics (track and field)
African Games bronze medalists for Mauritius